is a community in Chiba City, Chiba Prefecture, Japan. It is within Hanamigawa-ku and Mihama-ku.

The seaside area of Makuhari was reclaimed from the sea. The district was constructed in a span of 10 years. Steven Poole, author of Trigger Happy, described it as "Japan's own vision of the future now". Poole added that is a "shrine to techno-optimism" that "looks just like a city out of a video game".

Attractions
 Makuhari Messe
 Chiba Marine Stadium
 Tokyo Disney Resort is a 20-minute train ride from Kaihimmakuhari Station; the area's six hotels are a popular lodging spot for visitors to the resort.

Transport
 Makuhari Station
 Makuharihongō Station
 Kaihimmakuhari Station
 Keisei Makuhari Station
 Keisei Makuharihongō Station

Places

Hanamigawa Ward
 Makuharicho
 Makuharihongo

Mihama Ward
 Makuhari-nishi
 Hamada
 Toyosuna
 Wakaba
 Nakase
 Hibino
 Utase
 Mihama

Education
 Chiba Prefectural University of Health Sciences
 Kanda University of International Studies
 The Open University of Japan
 Tohto University
Makuhari Junior and Senior High School, a private school operated by Shibuya Kyouiku Gakuen, opened in 1983 as the Makuhari Senior High School.
 Makuhari Sohgoh High School
 Showa Gakuin Shuei Junior and Senior High School
 Makuhari International School, a private international school

References

 Poole, Steven Trigger Happy. Skyhorse Publishing, Inc., December 13, 2013. , 9781628722246.

Notes

Chiba (city)